Lovers is an album by David Murray released on the Japanese DIW label in 1988. It features six quartet performances by Murray with Fred Hopkins, Dave Burrell and Ralph Peterson Jr.

Track listing
 "Teardrops for Jimmy (Dedicated to Jimmy Garrison)" (Burrell) - 7:57  
 "Lovers" - 7:40  
 "In a Sentimental Mood" (Ellington, Kurtz, Mills) - 8:49  
 "Ming" - 9:48  
 "Water Colors" (Peterson) - 6:47  
 "Nalungo (For Nalungo Mwanga)"  (Mwanga) - 7:49  
All compositions by David Murray except as indicated

Personnel
David Murray - tenor saxophone
Dave Burrell - piano
Fred Hopkins - bass
Ralph Peterson Jr. - drums

References

1988 albums
David Murray (saxophonist) albums